Timothy Davis Crabbe (born February 20, 1988) is an Italian-American former professional baseball pitcher.

He was drafted by the Reds in the 14th round of the 2009 MLB draft out of Westmont College. The Reds invited Crabbe to spring training as a non-roster invitee in 2014.

He was on the roster for the Italy national baseball team at the 2013 World Baseball Classic.

References

External links

1988 births
Baseball pitchers
Living people
2013 World Baseball Classic players
Billings Mustangs players
Dayton Dragons players
Bakersfield Blaze players
Pensacola Blue Wahoos players
Peoria Javelinas players
Reno Aces players
Westmont Warriors baseball players
Louisville Bats players
Mobile BayBears players
Charlotte Knights players
Birmingham Barons players